Günther cabinet may refer to:

 First Günther cabinet, Schleswig-Holstein state government 2017-2022
 Second Günther cabinet, Schleswig-Holstein state government since 2022